Schrager is a surname. Notable people with the surname include:

Carol Schrager (born 1953), American lawyer
Ian Schrager (born 1946), American hotelier and real estate developer
James E. Schrager, American academic
Peter Schrager (born 1982), American sports journalist
Sheldon Schrager (born 1931), American film producer